Hotel Sansone, also known as the Hotel Springfield and Hotel Sterling, is a historic hotel building located in Springfield, Missouri, United States. Built in 1911, it is a four-story American Craftsman style brick building. It measures 44 feet wide by 110 feet deep.  It features a stepped parapet, beneath which is set a shallow overhanging hip roof sheathed with green Spanish tiles, and supported by heavy carved wooden brackets.

It was listed on the National Register of Historic Places in 2000.

References

Hotel buildings on the National Register of Historic Places in Missouri
Hotel buildings completed in 1911
Buildings and structures in Springfield, Missouri
National Register of Historic Places in Greene County, Missouri